Werner Fuetterer (10 January 1907 in Barth, Mecklenburg-Vorpommern – 7 February 1991 in Benidorm, Province of Alicante, Spain) was a German film actor. He appeared in nearly 100 films between 1925 and 1967.

In his early film career, Fuetterer often played young romantic lovers, but never managed the breakthrough to stardom. He later turned to character and supporting roles, often as the main characters best friend. Fuetterer remains perhaps best known for his role as the Archangel in F. W. Murnau's silent film classic Faust (1926). He later retired from acting and managed a camping facility in Spain, where he died in 1991 at age 84.

Selected filmography

 The Flying Dutchman (1925) - Sven
 The Brothers Schellenberg (1926) - Georg Weidenbach
 The Wiskottens (1926) - Ewald - der 'Maler', Sohn
 I Lost My Heart in Heidelberg (1926) - Rudolf - sein Sohn
 Kubinke the Barber (1926) - Kubinke, der Barbier
 Faust (1926) - Erzengel / Archangel
 Uneasy Money (1926) - Andreas, Annas Freund und Nachbar
 Chaste Susanne (1926) - Hubert
 A Sister of Six (1926) - Geza
 Out of the Mist (1927) - Robert Hellmich
 Durchlaucht Radieschen (1927) - Graf Casimir Conjak
 Ich war zu Heidelberg Student (1927)
 Queen of the Boulevards (1927) - Lucien
 Grand Hotel (1927)
 The Prince of Pappenheim (1927) - Sascha, Prinz von Gorgonien
 The Woman from Till 12 (1928) - Freddie Werder - Young Man
 Only a Viennese Woman Kisses Like That (1928) - Der Anton
 Artists (1928) - Fred Milson
 The Love Commandment (1928) - Raul Warburg
 Single Mother (1928)
 At Ruedesheimer Castle There Is a Lime Tree (1928) - Fritz von Hohenstein
 The Girl from the Revue (1928) - Graf Axel Holm, Attaché
 The Weekend Bride (1928) - Hans
 The Most Beautiful Woman in Paris (1928)
 The Weekend Bride (1928) - Dr. Schwarzecker
 The Crazy Countess (1928) - Graf Walter von Hagenau, sein Neffe
 L'évadée (1929) - John Fitzbury
 Dawn (1929) - Stephan, sein Sohn
 Storm of Love (1929) - Jonel
 The Girl with the Whip (1929) - Edgar Krell
 Im Prater blühen wieder die Bäume (1929) - Mucki von Rehlen
 Never Trust a Woman (1930) - Peter
 You'll Be in My Heart (1930) - Marquis Duverge
 Wiener Herzen (1930)
 Pasák holek (1930) - Jarda Duschnitz
 The Rhineland Girl (1930) - Hans Waldorf
 Oh Those Glorious Old Student Days (1930) - Student Robert Riedel
 Once I Loved a Girl in Vienna (1931) - Franz von Wergenthin
 Die Frau - Die Nachtigall (1931) - Algeri Tiejten
 Marriage with Limited Liability (1931) - Georg Kaiser I.
 Die Vier vom Bob 13 (1932) - Treß
 Cruiser Emden (1932) - Petzold
 The Cruel Mistress (1932) - Jim Bock
 Night of Temptation (1932)
 Daughter of the Regiment (1933) - Lord Robert
 Heimat am Rhein (1933) - Hannes Lorenz
 His Majesty's Adjutant (1934) - Prinz Eugen
 Just Once a Great Lady (1934) - Wolf von Wolfenstein
 Achtung! Wer kennt diese Frau? (1934) - Walter von Molnar, Forstassistent
 What Am I Without You (1934) - Himself
 The Model Husband (1937) - Fred Evans
 Target in the Clouds (1939) - Dieter von Kamphausen
 Central Rio (1939) - Michael Wenk
 Der singende Tor (1939) - Antonio
 Casa lontana (1939) - James Kennedy
 A Man Astray (1940) - Nils Nilsen
 Heimkehr (1941) - Oskar Friml
 Der Seniorchef (1942) - Konrad von Schulte
 I Entrust My Wife to You (1943) - Robert
 Fritze Bollmann wollte angeln (1943) - Johannes Gottlieb Blank
 Leichtes Blut (1943) - Karl Schwertfeger
 Um neun kommt Harald (1944) - Harald Heimendahl
 The Years Pass (1945) - Wilhelm Kersten, dessen Sohn
 Journey to Happiness (1948) - Richard Jürgens
 Beloved Liar (1950) - Dr. Gößler
 Das seltsame Leben des Herrn Bruggs (1951) - Dr. Fiedler - Sekretär
 Miracles Still Happen (1951) - Felix Schön
 Decision Before Dawn (1951) - von Bülow (uncredited)
 That Can Happen to Anyone (1952) - Paul Süsskind
 Until We Meet Again (1952) - Bernard - Modesalonbesitzer
 Holiday From Myself (1952) - Stone, Stefensons Privatsekretär
 The Chaplain of San Lorenzo (1953) - Dr. Matheson
 Salto Mortale (1953)
 Not Afraid of Big Animals (1953) - Bollmann
 Secretly Still and Quiet (1953) - Conradi
 Christina (1953) - Direktor Werner Holk
 The Private Secretary (1953) - Ostermann
 My Sister and I (1954) - Graf Kollinoff
 Ten on Every Finger (1954) - Gregor Bruchsal
 Secrets of the City (1955) - Dr. Gunther
 Des Teufels General (1955) - Baron von Pflunck
 Ein Mann vergißt die Liebe (1955)
 I Know What I'm Living For (1955) - Dr. Schneider, RA.
 The Inn on the Lahn (1955) - Herr Sonnenschein
 Love, Dance and a Thousand Songs (1955) - Heidemann
 In Hamburg When the Nights Are Long (1956)
 Du bist Musik (1956) - Gesandter
 Siebenmal in der Woche (1957) - Kruttke
 Träume von der Südsee (1957) - Hjalmar Nielsen
 Heimatlos (1958) - Hanuschke
 Nick Knatterton’s Adventure (1959) - Redakteur
 Frau im besten Mannesalter (1959) - Karsten, Rechtsanwalt
 La Paloma (1959) - Stefan Holden
 A Thousand Stars Aglitter (1959) - Radioreporter
 Ein Student ging vorbei (1960) - Graf Hohenpersch
 Sweetheart of the Gods (1960) - Harry de Cassian
 I Learned That in Paris (1960) - Hubert Wüstenhagen
 Mister Dynamit - Morgen küßt euch der Tod (1967) - General Probst (final film role)

Bibliography
 Hardt, Ursula. From Caligari to California: Erich Pommer's Life in the International Film Wars. Berghahn Books, 1996.

External links

1907 births
1991 deaths
German male film actors
German male silent film actors
Actors from Mecklenburg-Western Pomerania
20th-century German male actors
German expatriates in Spain